The Ganden Phodrang or Ganden Podrang was the Tibetan system of government  established by the 5th Dalai Lama in 1642; it operated in Tibet until the 1950s. Lhasa became the capital of Tibet again early in this period, after the Oirat lord Güshi Khan conferred all temporal power on the 5th Dalai Lama in a ceremony in Shigatse in 1642. The Ganden Phodrang accepted China's Qing emperors as overlords after  1720,
and the Qing became increasingly active in  governing Tibet starting in the early 18th century. After the  fall of the Qing empire in 1912, the Ganden Phodrang government lasted until the 1950s, when  the People's Republic of China (PRC) invaded Tibet. During most of the time from the early Qing period until the end of Ganden Phodrang rule, a governing council known as the Kashag operated as the highest authority in the Ganden Phodrang administration.

The Ganden Phodrang was established by the 5th Dalai Lama and Tibet's patron Güshi Khan of the Khoshut, in 1642. At that time, the Potala Palace was built (1645- ) in Lhasa on the site of the Red Fort, to where the capital of Tibet had been moved from Yarlung Valley by the 7th-century King Songsten Gampo. Güshi Khan offered all political power to the 5th Dalai Lama in Shigatse, within a  priest-and-patron relationship context between the Dalai Lama and the Gelug school, and Güshi Khan.

A  drawn-out war (1687–1757) between the  Dzungar Khans and Qing China led to turmoil for Lhasa, since the Ganden Phodrang was the diplomatic center for the  Mongols and the Qing. In 1705, the Qing conspired with a Dzungar faction to kidnap the 6th Dalai Lama, after the murder of his regent and government official. Due to these actions, Tibet's relationship with the Mongols declined in popularity.

The Dzungars then invaded Central Tibet in 1717, after which the Ganden Phodrang's army and the Qing army joined forces and expelled the Dzungars in 1720. While these Qing forces departed in 1723, the earlier 1653 priest-and-patron relationship established between Tibet and China then added military protection to the patron's role.

Soon after 1727 the skilful and politically astute Tibetan leader Pholhane reorganized the Ganden Phodrang's army, which lasted until the army was disbanded in 1950. Pholhane's son Gyurme Namgyal moved to end the army's joint missions with Qing China by expelling the last of their troops, whose numbers varied over the decades. He was murdered by two Qing China ambassadors (ambans) in 1750, both of whom were killed by Pholhane's army during the subsequent revolt in Lhasa.

The Ganden Phodrang's joint military operations with the Qing dynasty lasted from 1720 until 1846, and included working together in the  second of three wars between Nepal and Tibet (1788–1792). Just before and after their separation, the Ganden Phodrang's army defeated the Sikh Dogra forces, leading to an  1842 treaty establishing the Tibet-Dogra borders; defeated the chieftain  Gonpo Namgyal of Kham in 1865, which led to the reclaiming of eastern Kham under the authority of the Central Tibetan High Commission. The third Nepalese war (1855–1856) was also victorious for both sides, since  the treaty included provisions for mutual aid against aggressors.
This provision was invoked in 1950, after the  People's Republic of China invaded Tibet.

Name
"Ganden Phodrang" originally referred to the residential quarters of the Dalai Lama lineage at Drepung Monastery since the 2nd Dalai Lama. When the 5th Dalai Lama came to power and the expansion of the Potala Palace began, the Dalai Lama moved away from the actual quarters Ganden Phodrang and stayed at the Potala in the winter and Norbulingka in the summer. According to some, the Ganden Phodrang is represented by the Central Tibetan Administration or Dalai Lama's government-in-exile in Dharamshala, India after 1959. However, this is "Ganden Phodrang" in a different sense, the personal service or labrang of the Dalai Lama.

Ganden (དགའ་ལྡན) is the Tibetan name for the Tushita heaven, which, according to Buddhist cosmology, is where the future Buddha Maitreya resides. Phodrang (ཕོ་བྲང) means palace, hall, or dwelling.

History

Background
Altan Khan of the Tümed Mongols chose the Gelug order of Tibetan Buddhism as his Buddhist faith. In 1577 he invited the leader of this order, Sonam Gyatso, to come to Mongolia and teach his people. He designated Sonam Gyatso as "Dalai" (a translation into Mongolian of the name Gyatso, meaning "ocean"). As a result, Sonam Gyatso became known as the Dalai Lama. Since this title was also posthumously given to Gendun Drup and Gendun Gyatso, who were considered Sonam Gyatso's previous incarnations, Sonam Gyatso was recognized as being already the 3rd Dalai Lama.

Early era
The 5th Dalai Lama (r. 1642–1682) is known for unifying the Tibetan heartland under the control of the Gelug school of Tibetan Buddhism, after defeating the rival Kagyu and Jonang sects and the secular ruler, the Tsangpa prince, in a prolonged civil war. His efforts were successful in part because of aid from Güshi Khan, the Oirat leader who established the Khoshut Khanate. With Güshi Khan as a completely uninvolved patron, who had conferred supreme authority on the Dalai Lama for the whole of Tibet at a ceremony at Tashilhunpo Monastery in Shigatse, the 5th Dalai Lama and his intimates established a civil administration which is referred to by historians as the Lhasa state. All power and authority lay in the hands of the Dalai Lama right up to his death and Güshi Khan did not interfere in the administration nor tried to control its policies. The core leadership of this government is also referred to as the "Ganden Phodrang" or "Ganden Podrang", derived from the name of the estate of the Dalai Lamas at Drepung Monastery.

The 5th Dalai Lama initiated the construction of the Potala Palace in Lhasa, and moved the centre of government there from Drepung. It remained the chief residence of the Dalai Lama until the 14th Dalai Lama fled to India during the 1959 Tibetan uprising.

From 1679 to 1684, the Ganden Phodrang fought in the Tibet–Ladakh–Mughal War against the Namgyal dynasty of neighboring Ladakh, with the 5th Dalai Lama overruling the advice of his Prime Minister. The 5th Dalai Lama died in 1682 and the subsequent Prime Minister, Desi Sangye Gyatso, agreed on the 1684 Treaty of Tingmosgang with the King Delek Namgyal of Ladakh to end the war. The original text of the Treaty of Tingmosgang no longer survives, but its contents are summarized in the Ladakh Chronicles.

Qing protectorate

In 1717, the last khan of the Khoshut Khanate, Lha-bzang Khan, was killed by the Mongol Dzungar Khanate forces invading Lhasa. The Dzungar forces were in turn expelled by the expedition forces of the Qing dynasty from Tibet in 1720, thus beginning the period of Qing rule of Tibet.

The Kashag, the governing council of Tibet also lasted in Lhasa until the 1950s, was created in 1721 and set by the Qianlong Emperor of the Qing dynasty in 1751. In that year the Tibetan government was reorganized after the riots in Lhasa of the previous year.

The first Europeans to arrive in Tibet were the Portuguese missionaries António de Andrade and Manuel Marques in 1624. They were welcomed by the King and Queen of Guge, and were allowed to build a church and to introduce the Christian faith. The king of Guge eagerly accepted Christianity as an offsetting religious influence to dilute the thriving Gelugpa and to counterbalance his potential rivals and consolidate his position. All missionaries were expelled in 1745.

Post-Qing era

After the fall of the Qing dynasty in 1911, which ended Qing rule over Tibet, the 13th Dalai Lama declared himself ruler of an independent Tibet. It was considered by the Republic of China as a part of the new republic, which gave Tibet the status of an "Area".

This would last until the 1950s, when Tibet was incorporated into the People's Republic of China. The Kashag state structure remained in place for a few years but was formally dissolved in 1959 after the 1959 Tibetan uprising. The Tibet Autonomous Region was established by China in 1965 out of a part of the Tibetan ethno-cultural area. The Central Tibetan Administration was established by the 14th Dalai Lama and based in McLeod Ganj India since 1959.

See also
Kashag
Dalai Lama
Mongol conquest of Tibet
Khoshut Khanate
Dzungar Khanate
Tibet under Qing rule
Tibet (1912–51)
List of rulers of Tibet
Tibetan Government-in-Exile
Sikyong
Lobsang Sangay

References

Citations

Sources 

 

History of Tibet
17th century in Tibet
18th century in Tibet
19th century in Tibet
20th century in Tibet
Dalai Lamas